William Wright was an English academic during the 16th-century; he graduated B.A. from Balliol College, Oxford in 1523 and M.A. in 1528; and was  Master of Balliol from 1555 to 1559.

Notes

16th-century English people
Alumni of Balliol College, Oxford
Masters of Balliol College, Oxford